

2010 Angola Men's Basketball Cup
The 2010 Men's Basketball Cup was contested by 8 teams and won by Recreativo do Libolo, to win its first title. The finals, at the best of three games, was played on May 11, 14 and 17.

2010 Angola Women's Basketball Cup
The 2010 Women's Basketball Cup was contested by Interclube and Primeiro de Agosto, at the best of three games, on March 3 and 8, with Interclube winning the title by beating Primeiro de Agosto 50-46 and 56-53.

See also
 2010 Angola Basketball Super Cup
 2010 BAI Basket
 2010 Victorino Cunha Cup

References

Angola Basketball Cup seasons
Cup